Akwa Raphael Success is a Nigerian professional footballer who plays for Thai League 1 club Police Tero
as a winger.

References 

1998 births
Living people
Nigerian footballers
Association football forwards
Myanmar National League players
Raphael Success
Raphael Success
Expatriate footballers in Thailand